The London Penny Post was a premier postal system whose function was to deliver mail within London and its immediate suburbs for the modest sum of one penny. The Penny Post was established in 1680 by William Dockwra and his business partner, Robert Murray. Dockwra was a merchant and a member of the Armourer and Brasiers Livery Company and was appointed a Customs Under-Searcher for the Port of London in 1663. Murray would later become clerk in the excise office of the Penny Post. The London Penny Post mail service was launched with weeks of publicity preceding it on 27 March 1680. The new London Penny Post provided the city of London with a much needed intra-city mail delivery system. The new Penny Post was influential in establishing a model system and pattern for the various Provincial English Penny Posts in the years that followed. It was the first postal system to use hand-stamps to postmark the mail to indicate the place and time of the mailing and that its postage had been prepaid.  The success of the Penny Post would also threaten the interests of the Duke of York who profited directly from the existing general post office. It also compromised the business interests of porters and private couriers. The Penny Post was also involved in publishing various criticisms towards the British monarchy, the Duke of York in particular, which ultimately led to the takeover of the Penny Post by crown authorities. The earliest known Penny Post postmark is dated 13 December 1680 and is considered by some to be the world's first postage 'stamp'.

Mail services in London, 1680
Prior to the advent of the London Penny Post there was only one General Letter Office in London and Westminster to receive and deliver the mail that was bound for destinations outside London proper, but there was no system or provision for the general distribution of letters or parcels within the city of London itself. Dockwra and Murray's Penny Post provided such a service. The new Penny Post service proved very useful to London's merchants and to other businesses, and very popular among the citizenry of London, who hitherto had to pay more expensive rates to private couriers and porters to deliver mail or small packages within the city. With the growth of trade and the increase in the population of London (which had about half a million people at that time), there was an ever-increasing demand for a mail system that would serve London and its suburbs. With its cheap flat postage-rate of one penny, the Penny Post quickly became a commercial success.

Premier postal system

Several Penny Post offices were established at various points within London where letters that were collected from drop-boxes about the city were sorted and sent out for delivery. Dockwra, Murrey and their partners divided London as far as (inclusively) Westminster and Blackwall and Hackney and Lambeth into seven districts with a sorting office for each. They established a Head Office that was set up in the home of Dockwra himself who was living in a mansion on Lime Street that was formerly owned by Sir Robert Abdy. Dockwra established hourly collections, with a maximum of ten deliveries daily for London and a minimum of six deliveries for the various London suburbs, such as Hackney and Islington. However Robert Murray was arrested in May 1680, along with another associate of the Penny Post, George Cowdron, for distributing by means of the Penny Post what was considered to be seditious material criticising the Duke of York (afterwards James II). This left Dockwra to manage the Penny Post and as such credit is roundly given to him for its designs and further improvements as the Penny Post at that point having only been in operation for a couple of months was still in its developmental stages. Within two years the Penny Post had grown to such proportions that approximately four to five hundred receiving-houses and wall-boxes had been established at various locations about the city of London, however some of the accounts vary. E.g. in Robert Seymour's Survey of London and Westminster, published in 1735, he puts the number of receiving houses at over 600. Dockwra's Penny Post delivered letters and packets weighing up to one pound and delivery was guaranteed within four hours, each letter being marked with a heart shaped time stamp indicating the time an item was dropped off for delivery. Because the new postal service was affordable to the general public with its inexpensive flat rate of one penny it became an almost instant success and became the predecessor of the postal systems that later emerged and are still in use today in Great Britain and elsewhere today. To announce the new Penny Post's inter-city mail services public notices were published in several local newspapers (figure 1) and notices and posters were also printed and circulated.

Postmarks

When mail was submitted for delivery by the Penny Post the postage rate of one penny was charged and a hand-stamped postmark and time-stamp were applied to the mailed item confirming that its postage had been paid. The triangular postmarks used by Dockwra's Penny Post account for his fame among postal historians.

Four types of triangular postmarks were used to frank mail, (figure 4) but of the few that survive most are in museum archives, and only four are known to be in the hands of private collectors. The triangle-shaped postmark is considered by some historians and philatelists as the world's first postage stamp. Each Penny Post office had its own initial letter. The Penny Post also employed heart-shaped time stamps, one with the abbreviation  'Mor.'  designating a morning mailing and one with  'Af.'  indicating an afternoon mailing, along with the number of the hour i.e.  a numeral '4' indicating a 4 O'clock mailing. (figure 2) The triangle postmarks used on letters in 1680 differ somewhat from later examples. The 1680 postmarks are larger, with the shortest side to the triangle at the base.

The postmarks on mailings in 1681 have triangles whose longest side is situated at the base and with the word PAID inscribed upside-down within the triangle. (figure 3) There also exist examples of postmarks where the word paid is spelled as PAYD. The initial letter was located within the triangle; 'L' for the London office, 'W' for Westminster, 'S' for the Saint Paul office, however there is speculation that the 'L' marking may have indicated a mailing from the office in Dockwra's home on Lime St.

Takeover of Penny Post
When the Penny Post was first launched in 1680 there was much opposition to the new service. Its success took business from the General Post office, so much so that by 1682 a civil action was brought against Dockwra for having a monopoly on the postal services of the state. There were many couriers and porters who also regarded the Penny Post as a threat to the delivery services they offered and who sometimes resorted to assaulting the Post's messengers, tearing down advertisements and committing other acts of violence. There was also concern about the Whig party which was supporting the Penny Post and using it to distribute anti-Catholic and seditious newsletters in an attempt to exclude James II, Duke of York, from the succession to the throne on the grounds that he was Catholic. The Protestants denounced the concern as a design of the Duke of York and the Popish party. As a result, the Penny Post was taken over by the Crown authorities in that year and became part of the existing General Post Office. From that point on the postal rates gradually increased.

Before the emergence of the Penny Post the profits of the existing General Post Office were assigned by Parliament in 1663 to the Duke of York, who now had similar designs on Dockwra's lucrative Penny Post. As the Penny Post proved to be a great success and a potential new source of constant revenue the English government and the Duke of York at the time fined Dockwra £100 for contempt, claiming it infringed the monopoly of the General Post Office, and took control of the Penny Post's operations in 1682, bringing that enterprise to an end. Less than a month later the London Penny Post was made a branch of the General Post Office. For compensation of his losses Dockwra obtained a pension of £500 a year after the Revolution of 1688.

Over the years successive governments used the profits from the General Post Office and the London Penny Post as revenue. Much of the revenue that was being generated by the Penny Post was used to finance the various and almost continuous wars with France. Because the demands of the wars were so great, each time more money was needed to finance them the cost of postage was increased dramatically. This led to increasing public dissatisfaction and criticism of the high postage rates. At one point to send a letter across London the rates were as much as a day's wages for many. This went on for more than 100 years, and as a result of the mounting public complaints, a Committee of Enquiry was finally set up in 1835. Because of the excesses and indiscretions of the postal authorities and the much-needed reforms, Rowland Hill published a pamphlet entitled Post Office Reform, which led to various reforms and the introduction of the first postage stamp, the Penny Black. Because of its simplicity and ease of use the postage stamp brought reform to the post office, much like that of William Dockwra when his hand stamp struck the first letter delivered by the London Penny Post.

See also
Postage stamps and postal history of Great Britain
Postal administration
Penny Post
Penny Black
Postage stamp

Further reading 
 William Dockwra and the rest of the Undertakers: The story of the London penny post, 1680-2, Thomas Todd, Edinburgh, Cousland, 1952.
 The Penny Post 1680–1918, Frank Staff, Lutterworth Press, Cambridge, 1993. . 
 Her Majesty's Mail, William Lewins, Sampson Low, Son & Marston, London, 1864.
 The History of the British Post Office, J. Hemmeon, Harvard University, Cambridge, 1912.
 The Postage Stamps of Great Britain 1661–1941, Robson Lowe, Robson Lowe Ltd, London, 1941

References

Postal history of the United Kingdom
History of London
1680 establishments in England
Postage rates